Thunder Glacier is a through glacier, 4 nautical miles (7 km) long, which extends in an east-west direction across Wiencke Island between Sierra DuFief and the Wall Range, in the Palmer Archipelago. Probably known since the discovery of Wiencke Island by the Belgian Antarctic Expedition in 1898. Charted in 1944 by the Falkland Islands Dependencies Survey (FIDS), and so named by them because a survey party was nearly overwhelmed there by an avalanche.

See also
 List of glaciers in the Antarctic
 Glaciology

References

Glaciers of the Palmer Archipelago
Wiencke Island